Syed Khurshid Ahmed Shah (Urdu,; born 20 April 1952) is a Pakistani politician and lawyer who has been a member of the National Assembly of Pakistan since August 2018. Previously, he was member of the National Assembly between 1990 and May 2018.

He served as the Leader of the Opposition in the National Assembly of Pakistan from June 2013 to May 2018. A leader of the Pakistan Peoples Party (PPP), Shah was born in Sukkur and was educated at the Government Islamia Science College Sukkur.

Shah began his political career as the member of the Provincial Assembly of Sindh in 1988 and had been a member of the provincial cabinet, in various positions. He has been inducted into the federal cabinet thrice between 1993 and 2013. From 2012 to 2013, he also served as the parliament.

On 18 September 2019 ,The National Accountability Bureau (NAB) on Wednesday arrested senior PPP leader Syed Khursheed Shah in a case regarding his alleged assets beyond means.
On 21 October 2021, Supreme Court  released  him on bail.

Early life and education 
Shah was born on 20 April 1952. He completed his education from Government Islamia Science College, Sukkur. He received his master's degree in History in 1974 and his LLB in 1978, both from Islamia College, Sukkur. Shah is a professional lawyer and a businessman.

Political career 

Shah began his political career after becoming a member of the Provincial Assembly of Sindh for the first time in 1988 from Sukkur constituency on the Pakistan Peoples Party ticket, after which he became member of the provincial cabinet, in various positions. He served as the Minister for Education, Minister for transport, Minister for Import, Minister for Finance and Minister for Information.

Shah was elected as the member of the National Assembly for the first time in 1990 from Sukkur constituency. Shah was elected as the member of the National Assembly for the second time in 1993 from Sukkur constituency. Shah was inducted into federal cabinet in 1993 and was appointed as a Minister for Education in Benazir Bhutto's second ministry. Shah was re-elected as the member of the National Assembly for the third time in 1997 from Sukkur constituency. Shah was elected as the member of the National Assembly for the fourth time in 2002 from Sukkur constituency.

In 2012, Shah became chairman of the parliamentary committee on appointment of the Chief Election Commissioner of Pakistan. Shah was re-elected as the member of the National Assembly for the fifth time in 2008 from Sukkur constituency. Shah was inducted into the federal cabinet after the 2008 Pakistani elections and was appointed as a Minister for Labour, Manpower and Overseas Pakistanis from March 2008 to May 2011.  Minister for Labour, Manpower and Overseas Pakistanis was divided into two ministries in 2009, and Shah remained with Minister for Labour and Manpower. He was given the additional portfolio of Minister for Religious Affairs, where he served from December 2010 to 2013, both in the Gillani ministry. Shah was the parliamentarian leader of PPP in the National Assembly from 2008 to 2013.

Shah, along with leaders of other political parties, was tasked with selection on the name for caretaker prime minister of Pakistan prior to the 2013 Pakistan election. Shah was re-elected as the member of the National Assembly for the sixth time in 2013 from second Sukkur constituency. Shah was a potential candidate to become Prime Minister of Pakistan after Yousaf Raza Gillani was disqualified from holding the office. In June 2013, Shah was appointed as the Leader of the Opposition in National Assembly by PPP. Shah is also chairman of the Public Accounts Committee in the National Assembly. Shah is said to have good relations with the leaders of other political parties in Pakistan.

He was re-elected to the National Assembly as a candidate of PPP from Constituency NA-206 (Sukkur-I) in 2018 Pakistani general election. Following his successful election, PPP nominated him for the office of Speaker of the National Assembly of Pakistan. He received 146 votes and lost the election to Asad Qaiser who received 176 votes.

References 

1952 births
Living people
Sindhi people
People from Sukkur District
Pakistan People's Party politicians
Pakistani lawyers
Pakistani MNAs 1990–1993
Pakistani MNAs 1993–1996
Pakistani MNAs 1997–1999
Pakistani MNAs 2002–2007
Pakistani MNAs 2008–2013
Pakistani MNAs 2013–2018
Sindh MPAs 1988–1990
Religious Ministers of Pakistan
Leaders of the Opposition (Pakistan)
Pakistani MNAs 2018–2023
Pakistani prisoners and detainees
Saraiki people
Provincial ministers of Sindh